The Australia women's national rugby union team, also known as the Wallaroos, has competed at all Women's Rugby World Cups since 1998, with their best result finishing in third place in 2010.

Australian women have been playing rugby since the late 1930s, in regional areas of New South Wales. In 1992 the first National Women's Tournament was held in Newcastle, NSW. The following year the Australian Women's Rugby Union was established, and it was declared that the national women's team would be called the Wallaroos. It was chosen because it was the name of one of Australia's oldest clubs, the Wallaroo Football Club, which was formed in 1870.

History 
The Wallaroos played their first international in 1994 against New Zealand, also known as the Black Ferns. The match was played at North Sydney Oval, and New Zealand won the game 37 to 0. The team placed fifth at their first World Cup appearance in 1998 in the Netherlands. They placed fifth at the 2002 event in Barcelona, Spain also.

In 2014, The Wallaroos played two Test matches in New Zealand against their Tasman rivals, the Black Ferns, and North American outfit, Canada. Although losing both of these matches, the Wallaroos took this experience into the 2014 Women's Rugby World Cup. The Australian team was second in the pool stage behind host team France and was narrowly defeated by the United States in the first playoff, but beat Wales in their last match to finish the tournament in seventh place.

Records

Rugby World Cup

Overall

(Full internationals only)

Summary of matches, updated to 10 May 2022:

Players

Recent squad 
Wallaroos 32-player squad for the 2021 Rugby World Cup.

Notable players 

Cheryl McAfee is the first Wallaroo to be inducted into the World Rugby Hall of Fame in 2021. She led the Australian women's sevens team in the inaugural Women’s Rugby World Cup Sevens competition that was held in Dubai in March 2009. Later that year, she was invited by World Rugby to become a member of the bid team that successfully campaigned for the inclusion of rugby sevens in the Olympics. She also captained the Wallaroos from 2006 to 2010, including at the 2010 Rugby World Cup where they achieved their best result of third place.

Previous squads

Captains

Coaches

See also

Laurie O'Reilly Cup
Super W
National Women's Rugby Championship – predecessor tournament of Super W
Australia women's national rugby sevens team
Women's rugby union in Australia

Notes

References

External links

 
 Wallaroos chase World Cup glory
 List of results 
 History of Australian Women's Rugby

 
Women's national rugby union teams
Oceanian national women's rugby union teams
national